Burrells is a hamlet in the Eden District, in the English county of Cumbria. Burrells is located on the B6260 Road in between the town of Appleby-in-Westmorland and the hamlet of Hoff. Its post code is CA16. Historically, Burrells was a township in the Parish of Appleby in Westmorland. Hoff Quarry here, now disused, was an important local source of stone (geology: Brockram Breccia - a breccia of cemented limestone and sandstone fragments, dating from the Permian period). Burrells House, built in the early 19th century, is a Grade II listed building. The barn to the south of Burrells House was rebuilt in 1818 and is also Grade II listed.

References 

 Postcode-info.co.uk

Hamlets in Cumbria
Eden District